Durham is a rural unincorporated community in Roger Mills County, Oklahoma, United States.  It lies along State Highway 30, four miles south of the Antelope Hills and the Canadian River. The Oklahoma-Texas border is four miles to the west.

The post office opened May 15, 1902. Durham was named for the first postmaster, Doris Durham Morris.

Break O' Day Farm & Metcalfe Museum
The homestead of Western artist Augusta Metcalfe is in Durham, and is now the Break O' Day Farm & Metcalfe Museum, which is on the National Register of Historic Places listings in Roger Mills County, Oklahoma.  Metcalfe's paintings, as well as the work of contemporary regional artists, are displayed.  The homestead also provides insights into one family’s life in Oklahoma Territory and beyond.

The Antelope Hills, north of Durham, are also NRHP-listed.

Demographics

References

Further reading
Shirk, George H. Oklahoma Place Names. Norman: University of Oklahoma Press, 1987.  .

Unincorporated communities in Roger Mills County, Oklahoma
Unincorporated communities in Oklahoma